Tinogasta Airport was a public airport located  north-northwest of Tinogasta, a town in the Catamarca Province of Argentina.

Google Earth Historical Imagery (10/24/2013) and current Google Maps show the runway is closed.

See also

Transport in Argentina
List of airports in Argentina

References

External links 
OpenStreetMap - Tinogasta Airport

Defunct airports
Airports in Argentina
Catamarca Province